Capros may refer to:

 CapROS, an open source computer operating system
 Capros (genus), a genus of fish of the family Caproidae